The 2020–21 UEFA Champions League qualifying phase and play-off round began on 8 August and ended on 30 September 2020.

A total of 53 teams competed in the qualifying system of the 2020–21 UEFA Champions League, which includes the qualifying phase and the play-off round, with 43 teams in Champions Path and 10 teams in League Path. The six winners in the play-off round (four from Champions Path, two from League Path) advanced to the group stage, to join the 26 teams that enter in the group stage.

Times are CEST (UTC+2), as listed by UEFA (local times, if different, are in parentheses).

Teams

Champions Path
The Champions Path includes all league champions which do not qualify directly for the group stage, and consists of the following rounds:
Preliminary round (4 teams playing one-legged semi-finals and final): 4 teams which enter in this round.
First qualifying round (34 teams): 33 teams which enter in this round, and 1 winner of the preliminary round.
Second qualifying round (20 teams): 3 teams which enter in this round, and 17 winners of the first qualifying round.
Third qualifying round (10 teams): 10 winners of the second qualifying round.
Play-off round (8 teams): 3 teams which enter in this round, and 5 winners of the third qualifying round.

All teams eliminated from the Champions Path enter the Europa League:
The 3 losers of the preliminary round and 17 losers of the first qualifying round enter the Champions Path second qualifying round.
Among the 10 losers of the second qualifying round:
8 losers enter the Champions Path third qualifying round
2 losers, determined by a draw held on 31 August 2020 after the Europa League second qualifying round draw, enter the Champions Path play-off round.
The 5 losers of the third qualifying round enter the Champions Path play-off round.
The 4 losers of the play-off round enter the group stage.

Below are the participating teams of the Champions Path (with their 2020 UEFA club coefficients), grouped by their starting rounds.

League Path
The League Path includes all league non-champions which do not qualify directly for the group stage, and consists of the following rounds:
Second qualifying round (6 teams): 6 teams which enter in this round.
Third qualifying round (6 teams): 3 teams which enter in this round, and 3 winners of the second qualifying round.
Play-off round (4 teams): 1 team which enters in this round, and 3 winners of the third qualifying round.

All teams eliminated from the League Path enter the Europa League:
The 3 losers of the second qualifying round enter the Main Path third qualifying round.
The 3 losers of the third qualifying round and the 2 losers of the play-off round enter the group stage.

Below are the participating teams of the League Path (with their 2020 UEFA club coefficients), grouped by their starting rounds.

Format
In a change to the format as a result of the COVID-19 pandemic in Europe, each tie prior to the play-off round is played as a single-legged match hosted by one of the teams decided by draw, except for the preliminary round which is played at neutral venue. If scores are level at the end of normal time, extra time is played, followed by a penalty shoot-out if the scores remain tied.

The play-off round ties are played over two legs, with each team playing one leg at home. The team that scores more goals on aggregate over the two legs advances to the next round. If the aggregate score is level, the away goals rule is applied, i.e. the team that scores more goals away from home over the two legs advances. If away goals are also equal, then extra time is played. The away goals rule is again applied after extra time, i.e. if there are goals scored during extra time and the aggregate score is still level, the visiting team advances by virtue of more away goals scored. If no goals are scored during extra time, the tie is decided by a penalty shoot-out.

In each draw, teams are seeded based on their 2020 UEFA club coefficients. For any team whose club coefficients are not final at the time of a draw, their club coefficients at that time, taking into account of all 2019–20 UEFA Champions League and Europa League matches played up to that point, are used (Regulations Article 13.03). Teams are divided into seeded and unseeded pots containing the same number of teams, and a seeded team is drawn against an unseeded team. For each tie, a draw is made between the two teams, and the first team drawn is the home team in single-legged matches (or the administrative "home" team in preliminary round matches), or home team of the first leg in play-off round two-legged ties. If the identity of the winners of the previous round is not known at the time of the draws, the seeding is carried out under the assumption that the team with the higher coefficient of an undecided tie advances to this round, which means if the team with the lower coefficient is to advance, it simply takes the seeding of its opponent. Teams from associations with political conflicts as decided by UEFA may not be drawn into the same tie. Prior to the draws, UEFA may form "groups" in accordance with the principles set by the Club Competitions Committee and based on geographical, logistical and political reasons, and they are purely for convenience of the draw and do not resemble any real groupings in the sense of the competition.

Due to the COVID-19 pandemic in Europe, all qualifying matches are played behind closed doors. The following special rules are applicable to the qualifying phase and play-offs:
Prior to each draw, UEFA publish the list of known travel restrictions related to the COVID-19 pandemic. All teams must inform UEFA if there are other existing restrictions other than those published. If a team fails to do so which as a consequence the match cannot take place, the team is considered responsible and to have forfeited the match.
If travel restrictions imposed by the home team's country prevent the away team from entering, the home team must propose an alternative venue that allows the match to take place without any restrictions. Otherwise they are considered to have forfeited the match.
If travel restrictions imposed by the away team's country prevent the away team from leaving or returning, the home team must propose an alternative venue that allows the match to take place without any restrictions. Otherwise UEFA decide on a venue.
If after the draw, new restrictions imposed by either the home team's or away team's country prevent the match from taking place, the team of that country are considered to have forfeited the match.
If either team refuses to play the match, they are considered to have forfeited the match. If both teams refuse to play or are responsible for a match not taking place, both teams are disqualified.
If a team has players and/or officials tested positive for SARS-2 coronavirus preventing them from playing the match before the deadline set by UEFA, they are considered to have forfeited the match.
In all cases, the two teams may agree to play the match at the away team's country or at a neutral country, subject to UEFA's approval. UEFA has the final authority to decide on a venue for any match, or to reschedule any match if necessary.
If, for any reason, the qualifying phase and play-offs cannot be completed before the deadline set by UEFA, UEFA decide on the principles for determining the teams qualified for the group stage.
Four countries (Poland, Hungary, Greece and Cyprus) have provided neutral venue hubs which allow matches to be played at their stadiums without restrictions.

Schedule
The schedule of the competition is as follows (all draws are held at the UEFA headquarters in Nyon, Switzerland). The tournament would originally have started in June 2020, but had been delayed to August due to the COVID-19 pandemic in Europe. The new schedule was announced by the UEFA Executive Committee on 17 June 2020.

The original schedule of the competition, as planned before the pandemic, was as follows (all draws held at the UEFA headquarters in Nyon, Switzerland, unless stated otherwise).

Preliminary round

The draw for the preliminary round was held on 17 July 2020, 12:00 CEST.

Seeding
A total of four teams played in the preliminary round. As the draw was held before the UEFA entry deadline and the participating teams were not yet confirmed, only the associations of the teams were used, and seeding of teams was based on their association coefficients instead of their club coefficients. For the semi-final round, two teams (from associations 52 and 53, Northern Ireland and Kosovo) were seeded and two teams (from associations 54 and 55, Andorra and San Marino) were unseeded. The first team drawn in each tie in the semi-final round and the final round would be the administrative "home" team.

Bracket

Summary

The semi-finals were played on 8 August at the Colovray Stadium in Nyon, Switzerland. The final was due to be played at the same venue on 11 August but the match was cancelled due to Drita players being put into quarantine after two players had tested positive for SARS-2 coronavirus, and Linfield were awarded a technical 3–0 win.

|+Semi-final round

|}

|+Final round

|}

Semi-final round

Final round

First qualifying round

The draw for the first qualifying round was held on 9 August 2020, 12:00 CEST.

Seeding
A total of 34 teams played in the first qualifying round: 33 teams which entered in this round, and 1 winner of the preliminary round. Seeding of teams was based on their 2020 UEFA club coefficients. For the winner of the preliminary round, whose identity was not known at the time of draw, the club coefficient of the highest-ranked remaining team was used. The first team drawn in each tie would be the home team.

Notes

Summary

The matches were played on 18 and 19 August 2020. The match between KÍ and Slovan Bratislava was cancelled due to Slovan Bratislava players being put into quarantine after one player had tested positive for SARS-2 coronavirus, and KÍ were awarded a technical 3–0 win.

|}

Matches

Second qualifying round

The draw for the second qualifying round was held on 10 August 2020, 12:00 CEST.

Seeding
A total of 26 teams played in the second qualifying round. They were divided into two paths:
Champions Path (20 teams): 3 teams which entered in this round, and 17 winners of the first qualifying round.
League Path (6 teams): 6 teams which entered in this round.
Seeding of teams was based on their 2020 UEFA club coefficients. For the winners of the first qualifying round, whose identity was not known at the time of draw, the club coefficient of the highest-ranked remaining team in each tie was used. The first team drawn in each tie would be the home team.

Notes

Summary

The matches were played on 25 and 26 August 2020.

|+Champions Path

|}

|+League Path

|}

Champions Path

League Path

Third qualifying round

The draw for the third qualifying round was held on 31 August 2020, 12:00 CEST.

Seeding
A total of 16 teams played in the third qualifying round. They were divided into two paths:
Champions Path (10 teams): 10 winners of the second qualifying round (Champions Path).
League Path (6 teams): 3 teams which entered in this round, and 3 winners of the second qualifying round (League Path).
Seeding of teams was based on their 2020 UEFA club coefficients. The first team drawn in each tie would be the home team.

Notes

Notes

Summary

The matches were played on 15 and 16 September 2020.

|+Champions Path

|}

|+League Path

|}

Champions Path

League Path

Play-off round

The draw for the play-off round was held on 1 September 2020, 12:00 CEST.

Seeding
A total of 12 teams played in the play-off round. They were divided into two paths:
Champions Path (8 teams): 3 teams which entered in this round, and 5 winners of the third qualifying round (Champions Path).
League Path (4 teams): 1 team which entered in this round, and 3 winners of the third qualifying round (League Path).
Seeding of teams was based on their 2020 UEFA club coefficients. For the winners of the third qualifying round, whose identity was not known at the time of draw, the club coefficient of the highest-ranked remaining team in each tie was used. The first team drawn in each tie would be the home team of the first leg.

Since Russian and Ukrainian teams may not be drawn into the same tie for political reasons, the winners of the match involving Benfica had to play Krasnodar, and the winners of the match involving Dynamo Kyiv had to play the winners of the match involving Gent.

Notes

Notes

Summary

The first legs were played on 22 and 23 September, and the second legs were played on 29 and 30 September 2020.

|+Champions Path

|}

|+League Path

|}

Champions Path

Midtjylland won 4–1 on aggregate.

Red Bull Salzburg won 5–2 on aggregate.

Olympiacos won 2–0 on aggregate.

3–3 on aggregate. Ferencváros won on away goals.

League Path

Krasnodar won 4–2 on aggregate.

Dynamo Kyiv won 5–1 on aggregate.

Notes

References

External links

Fixtures and Results, 2020–21, UEFA.com

Qualifying Rounds
2020-21
August 2020 sports events in Europe
September 2020 sports events in Europe